Journal of Educational Media, Memory, and Society is a peer-reviewed academic journal published by Berghahn Books on behalf of the Leibniz Institute for Educational Media | Georg Eckert Institute. The journal aims to broaden our understanding of past and present societies by examining formal and informal educational media, especially texts and images found in textbooks, museums, memorials, films and digital media.

Central topics include conceptions of time and space, image formation, forms of representation and the construction of meaning and of ethnic, national, regional, religious, institutional and gender identity. Educational media are also examined in relation to their production and appropriation in institutional, sociocultural, political, economic and historical contexts.

JEMMS is international and interdisciplinary and welcomes empirically based contributions from the humanities, social sciences, STEM subjects as well as theoretical and methodological studies.

Abstracting and indexing 
The Journal of Educational Media, Memory, and Society is indexed and abstracted in:
 Abstracts in Anthropology
A Current Bibliography on African Affairs (Baywood)
Bibliometric Research Indicator List (BFI)
Education Resources Information Center (ERIC) 
ERIH PLUS (European Reference Index for the Humanities and the Social Sciences) 
Higher Education Abstracts
Historical Abstracts (EBSCO)
International Bibliography of Periodical Literature (IBZ)
 International Bibliography of Book Reviews of Scholarly Literature on the Humanities and Social Sciences (IBR)
 MLA Directory of Periodicals
 MLA International Bibliography
Norwegian Register for Scientific Journals, Series and Publishers
Periodicals Index Online (Chadwyck-Healey)
Scopus

External links
 
 Georg Eckert Institute for International Textbook Research
 Journal page at institute's website
Submission guidelines

Education journals
English-language journals
Biannual journals
Berghahn Books academic journals
Publications established in 2009